William Jameson may refer to:

William Jameson (botanist, born 1796) (1796–1873), Scottish-Ecuadorian botanist
William Jameson (botanist, born 1815) (1815–1882), Scottish botanist and doctor in India
William James Jameson (1898–1990), United States federal judge
William Jameson, member of the Jameson whiskey dynasty and manager of the Marrowbone Lane Distillery